Chémery-Chéhéry is a commune in the Ardennes department of northern France. The municipality was established on 1 January 2016 and consists of the former communes of Chémery-sur-Bar and Chéhéry.

See also 
Communes of the Ardennes department

References 

Communes of Ardennes (department)

Communes nouvelles of Ardennes
Populated places established in 2016
2016 establishments in France